Birds described in 1883  include  South Island takahe, Goldie's bird-of-paradise, black-crowned waxbill, marsh seedeater, peruvian plantcutter,  saffron siskin, Tanimbar boobook, black-bibbed monarch, cinnamon-tailed fantail, flutist wren, Kolombangara monarch, slaty-headed longbill, Green-and-white hummingbird, large-billed parrotlet, grey-bellied comet

Events
Foundation of the American Ornithological Society.

Publications
Henry Seebohm A History of British Birds London,R. H. Porter 1883-93 
Władysław Taczanowski,  1883. Description des espèces nouvelles de la collection péruvienne de M. le Dr. Raimondi de Lima. Proceedings of the Zoological Society of London Pt1 p. 70–72 pl.17. BHL Reference page. 
Hans von Berlepsch  and   Taczanowski, W., 1883. Liste des Oiseaux recuillis par MM. Stolzmann et Siemiradzki dans l'Ecuadeur occidental. Proceedings of the Zoological Society of London Pt.4: 536–577.
Richard Böhm , 1883 Ornithologische Notizen aus Central-Africa. Journal für Ornithologie 31_1883: 162 - 208.
Ongoing events
John Gould The birds of Asia 1850-83 7 vols. 530 plates, Artists: J. Gould, H. C. Richter, W. Hart and J. Wolf; Lithographers:H. C. Richter and W. Hart
Osbert Salvin and Frederick DuCane Godman 1879–1904. Biologia Centrali-Americana . Aves
Richard Bowdler Sharpe Catalogue of the Birds in the British Museum London,1874-98.
Anton Reichenow. Gustav Hartlaub, Hans von Berlepsch, Jean Cabanis and other members of the German Ornithologists' Society in Journal für Ornithologie online BHL
The Ibis

References

Bird
Birding and ornithology by year